Grayson is an unincorporated community in Ashe County, North Carolina, United States, located northeast of Creston. It lies at an elevation of 3,343 feet (1,019 m).

References

Unincorporated communities in Ashe County, North Carolina
Unincorporated communities in North Carolina